Marina Yevgenyevna Cherkasova (born 1 March 1972) is a Russian freestyle skier who specializes in the moguls discipline and competed at four Winter Olympics.

She was born in Moscow.

References 
 
 

1972 births
Living people
Russian female freestyle skiers
Freestyle skiers at the 1994 Winter Olympics
Freestyle skiers at the 2002 Winter Olympics
Freestyle skiers at the 2006 Winter Olympics
Freestyle skiers at the 2010 Winter Olympics
Olympic freestyle skiers of Russia
Skiers from Moscow